Peroxisomal membrane protein PEX16 is a protein that in humans is encoded by the PEX16 gene.

Function 

The protein encoded by this gene is an integral peroxisomal membrane protein. An inactivating nonsense mutation localized to this gene was observed in a patient with Zellweger syndrome of the complementation group CGD/CG9. Expression of this gene product morphologically and biochemically restores the formation of new peroxisomes, suggesting a role in peroxisome organization and biogenesis. Alternative splicing has been observed for this gene and two variants have been described.

Interactions
PEX16 has been shown to interact with PEX19.

References

Further reading

External links
  GeneReviews/NCBI/NIH/UW entry on Peroxisome Biogenesis Disorders, Zellweger Syndrome Spectrum
 OMIM entries on Peroxisome Biogenesis Disorders, Zellweger Syndrome Spectrum